Matthew Stuart Compton (born 4 February 1979 in Newport, Monmouthshire) is a former Welsh cricketer. Compton is a left-handed batsman who bowled left-arm medium pace.

Compton made his List-A debut for the Hampshire Cricket Board in the 1999 NatWest Trophy against Suffolk, where on debut he scored 105*. During the 1999 tournament he played a further two matches against Shropshire, where he scored 59 runs, and Glamorgan.

Compton made his last List-A appearance for the Hampshire Cricket Board in the 2000 NatWest Trophy against Huntingdonshire. He ended his one-day career with a batting average of 68.33.

Compton also represented the Hampshire Second XI in six matches between in 1999.

References

External links
Matthew Compton at Cricinfo
Matthew Compton at CricketArchive

1979 births
Living people
Sportspeople from Newport, Wales
Welsh cricketers
Hampshire Cricket Board cricketers